Videoville Showtime, Inc., doing business as VVS Films, is a leading Canadian motion picture distribution company founded by Ernie Grivakis. The company was formed in Montreal, Quebec on May 27, 1983 and operates its theatrical sales & marketing office out of Toronto, Ontario.

Films
The company's focus is commercial movies.

Distribution 
It has direct, full-service distribution across all media in both English and French speaking Canada.

References

External links
 Official Website
 VVS Films on Twitter
 VVS Films on Facebook
 VVS Films on YouTube
 VVS Films on IMDb

Home video companies of Canada
Film distributors of Canada